Heritiera javanica is a species of tree in the family Malvaceae, subfamily Sterculioideae.

Like other species in this subfamily, flowers are unisexual; trees may grows up to 40 m high, and their Vietnamese name (under H. cochinchinensis) is huỷnh.  No subspecies are listed in the Catalogue of Life.

References

External links 

javanica
Flora of Indo-China
Flora of Malesia